The Plaxton Verde was a step-entrance full-size single-decker bus body built by Plaxton between 1991 and 1997. It was built on a rear-engined chassis, the most popular of which was the Dennis Lance which accounted for over half of the Verdes built. The rest were on Volvo B10B, DAF SB220 and Scania N113 chassis.

The Verde has an aluminium structure, which is related to that of the smaller Pointer. The flat-sided, boxy shape is also similar to that of the Pointer, except for the front end, which has a "barrel-curvature" windscreen plus quarterlights.

On early vehicles (primarily the Scania N113s and DAF SB220s), the side windows have rounded corners and the quarterlights are deeper than the windscreen. Later built vehicles have square-cornered windows, an enlarged cab side window with an angled corner like that on the Pointer, and quarterlights which finish level with the windscreen. Minor alterations were also made to the front dash panel.

The forty DAF SB220/Plaxton Verdes, which went into service with Dublin Bus in 1993, had additional front grille apertures and dual door. They were known as the P class and were used to introduce a new high frequency brand known as 'City Swift' on route 39 (city centre - Blanchardstown). They were plagued with structural problems and returned to Scarborough more than once for remedial treatment. In 2003 they passed to sister company Bus Éireann and were converted to single door for school bus work. All are now withdrawn as of May 2015.

The Verde was identified by the letter L in Plaxton's post-1989 body numbering system.

See also
 List of buses

External links

Verde
Full-size buses
Step-entrance buses